Peyman Ranjbari is an Iranian footballer who plays for Naft Masjed Soleyman  in the Persian Gulf Pro League.

Club
Ranjabri started his professional career with Shahrdari Tabriz where he was promoted to the first team in Summer 2013. He made his professional debut for Shahrdari Tabriz against Siah Jamegan on February 15, 2015.

Club career statistics

Notes

References
 Peyman Ranjbari at Football Federation Islamic Republic of Iran

1992 births
Living people
Shahrdari Tabriz players
Iranian footballers
Sportspeople from Tabriz
Gostaresh Foulad F.C. players
Shahrdari Ardabil players
Paykan F.C. players
Association football forwards
Gol Gohar players